The Dragomirna Monastery was built during the first three decades of the 17th century, 15 km from Suceava, in the Mitocu Dragomirnei commune. It is the tallest medieval monastery in northern Moldavia and renowned in Orthodox architecture for its unique proportions and intricate details, mostly carved into stone. It lies among forested hills of fir and oak. The history of the monastery started in 1602, when the small church in the graveyard was built and dedicated to Saints Enoch, Elijah, and John the Theologian. In 1609 the dedication of the larger church was made to the "Descent of the Holy Spirit".

History
Unlike other monasteries, there is no votive inscription at Dragomirna. The year in which it was built and the names of the founders were discovered only after study of the documents of the time. The founders were the same as for the small church in the graveyard, the scholar, artist, and Metropolitan Anastasie Crimca; the high chancellor Lupu Stroici; and his brother, the treasurer Simion Stroici. Born in Suceava as the son of merchant Ioan Crimca and of the princess Carstina, Anastasie Crimca became a monk at the Putna monastery when he was young. There Crimca built his reputation as a prelate, patriot, and scholar and, above all, as an artist, which was expressed through his whole life. He ascended to the highest ranks in the Orthodox Church and became, in 1608, the Metropolitan of Moldavia. During the summer of 1600, he took the oath of faith to Michael the Brave (also known as 'Mihai Viteazu'), who entered the princely seat of Moldavia without fighting and succeeded in joining the three Romanian lands for the first time.

According to the inscription above the bell tower, in 1627, during the rule of Miron Barnovschi, because of the frequent invasions by the Turks and Tatars, the monastery was endowed by the prince with a defensive wall, which made it look like a fortress. In the four corners, there are narrow square towers. On the western and northern sides are the cells, built between 1843 and 1846. They were part of the general reconstruction. Inside the precincts, on the right side of the entrance, is the vaulted refectory, built in the Gothic style. It now holds the Dragomirna museum of ancient art. The large church's plan is a much-elongated rectangle, without side apses. It seems to be built up to defy the heights, to seek the light; it symbolized prayer soaring from the bottom of one's heart towards the holy sky.

Architectural details
"Seeing it is a joyful surprise," wrote the great historian Nicolae Iorga. "It's tall and narrows like a fine casket with holy relics; an architectural jewel which adorns the ancient woods of Bucovina." The church is built mostly of raw, unpolished stone, except for the pillars, which end with buttresses made of polished stone. At the windows, Gothic-style frets have intersected bars. Under the cornice, there are two bands of friezed arcatures. The church is encircled with a stone belt of three alternately woven bands. This belt, a symbol of the Holy Trinity, also contains an allegorical message from the bishop, who lived to see the union of the Romanian-speaking peoples accomplished by Michael the Brave: he urged the coming generations to guide national and faith unity through the Holy Church.

The tower of the church, very tall and slender, decorated throughout, emphasizes the vertical. The total height up to the Cross is 42 meters. The sculptures decorating the tower represent a repertoire of ornamental motifs, geometrical and vegetal - uncommon for the epoch of Michael the Brave and Petru Rareş. The interior consists of the portico, the bema, the nave, and the altar. The portico is elevated above the churchyard; from the portico to the altar, seven steps enhance the feeling of ascent and differentiate among the chambers of the church. A lace of ribs covers the vaults, a western Gothic style, here used in artistic interpretation by the Metropolitan himself. The motif of the braided rope is found on almost every surface of the vault, arches, and intersections with walls. Dragomirna has no funerary chamber; there are five tombs in the portico and one in the bema. The latter may be that of the chief founder, metropolitan Anastasie Crimca.

The church at Dragomirna is decorated with splendid frescoes, but they are to be found only in the altar and the nave. No one knows whether the bema and the portico were also formerly painted. The paintings represent yet another innovative element, both in themes and in painting techniques, related most closely to iconographic and miniature art. The Dragomirna museum contains precious elements of Romanian medieval civilization: embroideries; bookbindings fitted with gilded silver, most of them made by Grigore Moisiu; crosses carved in cedar and ebony; the candlelit at the dedication of the Big Church; the Homiliary of Metropolitan Varlaam; gold- and silver-embroidered garments; and other ecclesiastical objects and sacerdotal attire.

Gallery

At Dragomirna, the metropolitan Anastasie Crimca started a school for miniaturists and calligraphers, which became "a last blossoming and glittering of the Romanian art of miniature". Five manuscripts of the school of Dragomirna are kept in the museum of the monastery: two copies of the Four Gospels, two missals and a psalter, copied and illustrated by Anastasie Crimca and his disciples. They demonstrate the originality and talent of the Moldavian miniaturists. As a centre of Christian and ancient culture in the Romanian past, the Dragomirna monastery holds the artistic treasure that is evidence of the people's love for beauty and also of their skillfulness in achieving it.

The Church of the Descent of the Holy Spirit is unique in Romania for its unusual proportions. It is by far the tallest and narrowest church ever built. Its walls are not painted, but decorated with stone carvings. In 1609, Bishop Crimca had built the church with the aid of Great Chancellor Luca Stroici. The relation between the width, length, and height of the church is most unusual. The church is nine metres wide, which is an average width, but the height of more than 40 metres up the lantern tower, makes it seem extremely narrow. The church gives the impression of being a ship, the ancient symbol of the Christian Church. The façades are built of rough yellow sandstone.

See also
 Churches of Moldavia

References

External links

 

Romanian Orthodox monasteries of Suceava County
Historic monuments in Suceava County
Eastern Orthodox church buildings
Christian monasteries established in the 17th century